Herman Haar House, also known as the Haar-Bergman House and Byrd House, is a historic home located at Jefferson City, Cole County, Missouri. It was built about 1859, and is a -story, four bay, Missouri-German Vernacular brick dwelling.  It has a gable roof and two front doors. It was moved in 1986 to its present location.

It was listed on the National Register of Historic Places in 1997.

References

Houses on the National Register of Historic Places in Missouri
Houses completed in 1859
Buildings and structures in Jefferson City, Missouri
National Register of Historic Places in Cole County, Missouri